The feudal barony of Plympton (or Honour of Plympton) was a large feudal barony in the county of Devon, England, whose caput was Plympton Castle and manor, Plympton. It was one of eight feudal baronies in Devonshire which existed during the medieval era. It included the so-called Honour of Christchurch in Hampshire (now in Dorset), which was not however technically a barony. The de Redvers family, first holders of the barony, were also Lords of the Isle of Wight, which lordship was not inherited by the Courtenays, as was the barony of Plympton, as it had been sold to the king by the last in the line Isabel de Redvers, 8th Countess of Devon (1237–1293).

History

Domesday Book origins
Many of the lands which later formed the feudal barony of Plympton were formerly held by two Devon Domesday Book tenants-in-chief of King William the Conqueror (1066–1087):
 Robert d'Aumale (fl. 1086) (Latinised to de Albemarle), who lands are listed in 17 entries in the Domesday Book of 1086. who was lord of Aumale in Normandy, now in the département of Seine-Maritime, France.
 William de Poilley.

Descent
The descent of the feudal barony of Plympton was as follows:

de Redvers

 Richard de Redvers (died 1107), was granted the barony (with many other estates) by King Henry I (1100–1135), of which king he was a most trusted supporter. The lands comprising the barony were before this time part of the royal demesne of King William the Conqueror, as recorded in the Domesday Book of 1086.
 Baldwin de Redvers, 1st Earl of Devon (died 1155), son and heir, created first Earl of Devon by the Empress Matilda during The Anarchy.
 Richard de Redvers, 2nd Earl of Devon (died 1162), son.
 Baldwin de Redvers, 3rd Earl of Devon (died 1188), son, died childless.
 Richard de Redvers, 4th Earl of Devon (died c. 1193), brother, died childless.
 William de Redvers, 5th Earl of Devon (died 1217), uncle
 Baldwin de Redvers, 6th Earl of Devon (1217–1245), grandson. He was a minor at the death of his grandfather and thus became a ward of the king, who in 1218 granted possession of the barony to:
 Falkes de Breauté (died 1226), who married Margaret, mother of his ward the 6th Earl. His estates were confiscated in 1224 and remained in the king's hands until Baldwin attained his majority in 1238.
 Baldwin de Redvers, 7th Earl of Devon (1236–1262), son, died childless.
 Isabel de Redvers, 8th Countess of Devon (1237–1293), sister. She was married at a young age to William de Forz, 4th Earl of Albemarle (died 1260). She was predeceased by all six of her children by William de Forz. After her death in 1293 aged 56 the feudal barony of Plympton and eventually the earldom of Devon passed to her 17-year-old second cousin once removed Hugh de Courtenay (1276–1340), feudal baron of Okehampton, Devon, who in 1335 was declared Earl of Devon. He was the great-grandson of Mary de Vernon (daughter of William de Redvers, 5th Earl of Devon (died 1217)) and her husband Robert de Courtenay (died 1242), feudal baron of Okehampton. In 1314/15 he petitioned parliament, unsuccessfully, claiming his right to the lordship of the Isle of Wight and to the adjacent manor of Christchurch, Hampshire, as heir of Isabella.

Courtenay

 Robert de Courtenay (died 1242), feudal baron of Okehampton, son of Reginald de Courtenay (died 1194) by his wife Hawise de Curcy (died 1219), heiress of Okehampton. He married Mary de Vernon, daughter of William de Redvers, 5th Earl of Devon (died 1217), feudal baron of Plympton. From this marriage the Courtenays later inherited the barony of Plympton in 1293 and in 1335 were declared Earls of Devon.
 John de Courtenay (died 1274), (son) who married Isabel de Vere, daughter of Hugh de Vere, 4th Earl of Oxford (c. 1210 – 1263)
 Sir Hugh de Courtenay (died 1292), (son) who married Eleanor le Despenser (died 1328), daughter of Hugh le Despenser, 1st Earl of Winchester (1261–1326).
 Hugh Courtenay, 9th Earl of Devon (1276–1340), (son). In 1293 on the death of his cousin Isabella de Forz, Countess of Devon (1237–1293) (eldest daughter of Baldwin de Redvers, 6th Earl of Devon (1217–1245), feudal baron of Plympton in Devon) he became heir to the feudal barony of Plympton, and in 1335 was declared Earl of Devon. The descent of the feudal barony of Okehampton thenceforth follows the descent of the earldom of Devon. In 1539 King Henry VIII seized the lands of the barony and had Henry Courtenay, 1st Marquess of Exeter (died 1539) executed for treason. The Earldom of Devon became forfeit, and the Courtenay lands in Cornwall escheated (i.e. reverted) to the crown to be held by the Duchy of Cornwall.

List of constituent manors

The barony comprised originally the following manors held in-chief per baroniam:

*Domesday tenants identified in Testa de Nevil

The following fees originally held by Alfred the Breton may have also been part of the Honour

References

Sources
 
 Pole, Sir William (died 1635), Collections Towards a Description of the County of Devon, Sir John-William de la Pole (ed.), London, 1791, pp. 6–11, Plimton
 Sanders, I.J. English Baronies: A Study of their Origin and Descent 1086–1327, Oxford, 1960, pp. 137–8, Barony of Plympton
 Thorn, Caroline & Frank, (eds.) Domesday Book, (Morris, John, gen.ed.) Vol. 9, Devon, Parts 1 & 2, Phillimore Press, Chichester, 1985, chapter 1,17

Feudal baronies in Devon
Plympton